Christopher Coombe (born 13 July 1993) is a Namibian cricketer. He was selected as part of Namibia's squad for the 2015 ICC World Twenty20 Qualifier tournament. In August 2018, he was named in Namibia's squad for the 2018 Africa T20 Cup. In October 2018, he was named in Namibia's squad in the Southern sub region group for the 2018–19 ICC World Twenty20 Africa Qualifier tournament in Botswana.

References

External links
 

1993 births
Living people
Namibian cricketers
Sportspeople from Walvis Bay